The 1942 Ohio gubernatorial election was held on November 3, 1942. Incumbent Republican John W. Bricker defeated Democratic nominee John McSweeney with 60.50% of the vote.

Primary elections
Primary elections were held on August 11, 1942.

Democratic primary

Candidates
John McSweeney, former U.S. Representative
Joseph T. Ferguson, Ohio State Auditor
Clarence H. Knisley
Walter F. Heer
Frank A. Dye

Results

Republican primary

Candidates
John W. Bricker, incumbent Governor

Results

General election

Candidates
John W. Bricker, Republican 
John McSweeney, Democratic

Results

References

1942
Ohio
Gubernatorial